The Bayan Mandahu Formation (also known as Wulansuhai Formation or Wuliangsuhai Formation) is a geological unit of "redbeds" located near the village of Bayan Mandahu in Inner Mongolia, China Asia (Gobi Desert) and dates from the late Cretaceous Period. Laid down in the Campanian, it is dated somewhat uncertainly to between 75 and 71 mya (million years ago).

Description 
The paleoenvironment it preserves was semi-arid and characterized by alluvial (stream-deposited) and eolian (wind-deposited) sediments. The formation is known for its vertebrate fossils, most of which are preserved in unstructured sandstone, indicating burial by wind-blown sandstorms.

Paleofauna of the Bayan Mandahu Formation 
The fauna of the Bayan Mandahu is very similar in composition to the nearby Djadochta Formation, and the two may have been deposited at roughly the same time. These two formations share many of the same genera, but differ in the makeup of species. For example, the most common mammal in the Djadochta is Kryptobaatar dashzevegi, while in the Bayan Mandahu, it is the closely related Kryptobaatar mandahuensis. Similarly, the dinosaur fauna of the Djadochta includes Protoceratops andrewsi and Velociraptor mongoliensis, while the Bayan Mandahu contains Protoceratops hellenikorhinus and Velociraptor osmolskae.

Crocodylomorphs

Lizards 
An amphisbaenian species is known from the formation. An iguanian species is known from the formation.

Turtles

Mammals 
A taeniolabidoidea multituberculate is known from the formation.

Dinosaurs

Alvarezsaurs

Ankylosaurs

Birds

Ceratopsians

Dromaeosaurs

Hadrosaurs

Oviraptorosaurs

Sauropods

Troodontids

Tyrannosaurs

See also 

 Barun Goyot Formation
 List of fossil sites (with link directory)
 Nemegt Formation
 List of dinosaur-bearing rock formations

References

Bibliography 
  

Geologic formations of China
Upper Cretaceous Series of Asia
Campanian Stage
Sandstone formations
Aeolian deposits
Fossiliferous stratigraphic units of Asia
Paleontology in Inner Mongolia